Boggs is an unincorporated community on the Birch River in Webster County, West Virginia, United States. Boggs lies along West Virginia Route 82.

References

Unincorporated communities in Webster County, West Virginia
Unincorporated communities in West Virginia